The Varsity is a historic apartment building located at West Lafayette, Tippecanoe County, Indiana.  It was built in 1928, and is a three-story, "L"-shaped, Tudor Revival style brick building.  It has a limestone quoins and detailing, a Tudor-arched entrance, projecting pavilions, and semi-hexagonal projecting bays.

It was listed on the National Register of Historic Places in 2001.

References

Residential buildings on the National Register of Historic Places in Indiana
Tudor Revival architecture in Indiana
Residential buildings completed in 1928
Buildings and structures in Tippecanoe County, Indiana
National Register of Historic Places in Tippecanoe County, Indiana